The  was an infantry division of the Imperial Japanese Army. It was formed on 10 July 1940 at Himeji, simultaneously with 51st, 52nd, 55th, 56th, and 57th divisions. The formation nucleus was the headquarters of the 10th division. The men for the 54th division were recruited from Hyōgo, Okayama and Tottori prefectures. The 54th division was initially assigned to Central District Army.

In February 1943, the division was assigned to 16th army. The bulk of division have sailed from Moji on-board of "Miike Maru" ship, together with 30th Independent Mixed Brigade. 23 April 1943 it landed in Shanghai, and departed again for Saigon 19 July 1943, arriving 30 July 1943 to Saigon. The 154th infantry regiment and signals company has followed 12 May 1943 from the Ujina terminal of the Hiroshima, on-board "Takoma Maru" and "Nagato Maru" ships, arriving directly to Singapore 9 June 1943. The 54th division was re-subordinated to the 28th army in January 1944 and sent to Burma.

The 54th Division remained in the Arakan region of Burma during the Battle of the Admin Box in February 1944. From December 1944, it suffered heavy losses in Battle of Meiktila and Mandalay, including Battle of Hill 170 in January 1945 and was generally in full retreat to Irrawaddy River in April 1945. During the Battle of the Sittang Bend in July-August 1945, it suffered over 50% losses; from enemy shellfire, air raids, cholera and dysentery. At the surrender of Japan on 15 August 1945 the 54th division was situated on the eastern coasts of the Sittaung River.

See also
 List of Japanese Infantry Divisions

Notes
This article incorporates material from Japanese Wikipedia page 第54師団 (日本軍), accessed 3 June 2016

See also
 List of Japanese Infantry Divisions

Reference and further reading

Japanese World War II divisions
Infantry divisions of Japan
Military units and formations established in 1940
Military units and formations disestablished in 1945
1940 establishments in Japan
1945 disestablishments in Japan
J